The  was a class of three armed merchant cruisers of the Imperial Japanese Navy.

Background
The Akagi Maru-class vessels were originally built by Mitsubishi Heavy Industries for Nippon Yusen company as A-class cargo ships. They were converted to "special transport" role in 1940, and to "auxiliary cruiser" role in 1941 (and therefore armed).

Design

Operational history

Awata Maru
Awata Maru was slightly damaged in Doolittle Raid 18 April 1942. Later, it was a primary transport for the Japanese occupation of Kiska and Japanese occupation of Attu. It was sunk 22 October 1943 near Shanghai by the submarine .

Asaka Maru
Asaka Maru circumnavigated the globe in January–April 1941, bringing 3,000 tons of much needed military equipment from Germany. It also helped supply the Japanese occupation of Kiska. Asaka Maru was sunk by air attack 12 October 1944 near Penghu .

Akagi Maru
Akagi Maru was sunk by air attack 17 February 1944 in Chuuk Lagoon as a part of the Operation Hailstone.

List of ships
 Akagi Maru
 Asaka Maru
 Awata Maru

See also

List of ship classes of the Second World War

References

Bibliography

 

Auxiliary cruisers of the Imperial Japanese Navy